Jaime Alves Magalhães (28 March 1965 – 21 September 2020), known as Alves, was a Portuguese footballer who played as a midfielder.

References

External links

1965 births
2020 deaths
People from Espinho, Portugal
Portuguese footballers
Association football midfielders
Primeira Liga players
Liga Portugal 2 players
S.C. Espinho players
Boavista F.C. players
Vitória S.C. players
Portugal under-21 international footballers
Portugal international footballers
Sportspeople from Aveiro District